Bangra Union is a union of Kalihati Upazila, Tangail District, Bangladesh. It is situated 17 km north of Tangail, The District Headquarter.

Demographics

According to Population Census 2011 performed by Bangladesh Bureau of Statistics, The total population of Bangra union is 28872. There are 6885 households in total.

Education

The literacy rate of Bangra Union is 46.8% (Male-50.6%, Female-43.2%).

See also
 Union Councils of Tangail District

References

Populated places in Dhaka Division
Populated places in Tangail District
Unions of Kalihati Upazila